Cameron Park Zoo is a  natural habitat zoo located within Cameron Park in the city of Waco, Texas, United States, next to the Brazos River. Established in July 1993, Cameron Park Zoo has lush native vegetation that surrounds splashing waterfalls, a picturesque lake, and ponds. And in the midst of all this beauty, visitors see that the wild ones not only survive in their natural habitat, but they also flourish. The zoo features a diverse collection that includes over 1731 animals, representing 300 species from around the world.

The Cameron Park Zoo is accredited by the Association of Zoos and Aquariums (AZA) and is a member of the World Association of Zoos and Aquariums (WAZA).

History

Initially established in 1955 as the Central Texas Zoological Park by a group of wildlife enthusiasts who wanted to create an area for recreation and education opportunities.

In 1981, a master plan was established to expand the zoo, and in 1989 a countywide bond was issued to redevelop a  area of Cameron Park, into the Cameron Park Zoo. The project was completed, the old zoo was closed, and the new zoo was opened to the public on July 18, 1993.

The Cameron Park Zoo features species from North and South America, Africa, Asia and Europe. Including a large reptile house, an African lion display, and Lemur Island, a large open lemur habitat. In 2005, a large new area was opened called the Brazos River Country, featuring a  saltwater reef aquarium, a large swampland habitat, and many other native Texas type habitats, featuring numerous species found within the state. The exhibit is so large, it nearly doubled both the animal population and the overall size of the zoo. In 2009, the zoo added the Asian Forest, expanding its collection to include endangered species such as orangutans and Komodo dragons. These species joined the Sumatran tigers in the Asian Forest.

Cameron Park

Cameron Park Zoo is located with Cameron Park. It is located at the intersection of the Bosque River and Brazos River. Situated in Waco's Cameron Park, the zoo enjoys lush native vegetation and adjoins nearby limestone cliffs, which provide an excellent view of Waco.

Gallery

Notes

External links

 

Buildings and structures in Waco, Texas
Zoos in Texas
1955 establishments in Texas
Tourist attractions in Waco, Texas
Protected areas of McLennan County, Texas
Zoos established in 1955